Robert T. Carey was an American from Clinton, Wisconsin who served as a Whig member of the 1st Wisconsin Legislature as a member of the Wisconsin State Assembly from the district of Rock County consisting of the towns of Beloit, Clinton and Turtle.

References

Members of the Wisconsin State Assembly
People from Clinton, Rock County, Wisconsin
Wisconsin Whigs
19th-century American politicians
Year of birth missing
Year of death missing